In the mathematical fields of representation theory and group theory, a linear representation  (rho) of a group  is a monomial representation if there is a finite-index subgroup  and a one-dimensional linear representation  of , such that  is equivalent to the induced representation .

Alternatively, one may define it as a representation whose image is in the monomial matrices.

Here for example  and  may be finite groups, so that induced representation has a classical sense.

Definition 
To define the monomial representation, we first need to introduce the notion of monomial space. A monomial space is a triple where is a finite-dimensional complex vector space, is a finite set and is a family of one-dimensional subspaces of  such that .

References

Representation theory of groups